Justin Sumpter (born May 22, 1996) is a former American football wide receiver. He played college football at Kennesaw State University and attended Sandy Creek High School.

Early years 
Sumpter caught 27 passes for 423 yards and four touchdowns his senior year at Sandy Creek High School in Tyrone, Georgia. In addition to football, Sumpter lettered in basketball and track and field.

College career 
Sumpter led the Owls in receptions in each of his four seasons, and was named first-team All-Big South wide receiver following his sophomore, junior and senior years.

His one-handed catch against Liberty in 2017 was featured as ESPN's top play of that week.

Sumpter was invited to and participated in the 2019 College Gridiron Showcase college football all-star event.

Professional career 
After going undrafted in the 2019 NFL Draft, Sumpter was signed by the Los Angeles Rams as an undrafted free agent.

Sumpter signed with the Hamilton Tiger-Cats of the CFL on May 22, 2019. He retired from football on June 28, 2021.

References

External links
 Kennesaw State Owls bio

1996 births
Living people
People from Austell, Georgia
Sportspeople from Cobb County, Georgia
Players of American football from Georgia (U.S. state)
American football wide receivers
Kennesaw State Owls football players
Los Angeles Rams players
American players of Canadian football
Canadian football wide receivers
Hamilton Tiger-Cats players